In Greek mythology, Hesperus is the Evening Star, the planet Venus in the evening. He is one of the Astra Planeta. A son of the dawn goddess Eos (Roman Aurora), he is the half-brother of her other son, Phosphorus (also called Eosphorus; the "Morning Star"). Hesperus' Roman equivalent is Vesper (cf. "evening", "supper", "evening star", "west").  By one account, Hesperus' father was Cephalus, a mortal, while Phosphorus was the star god Astraios. Other sources, however, state that Hesperus was the brother of Atlas, and thus the son of Iapetus.

Variant names 
Hesperus is the personification of the "evening star", the planet Venus in the evening.  His name is sometimes conflated with the names for his brother, the personification of the planet as the "morning star"  Eosphorus (Greek , "bearer of dawn") or Phosphorus (Ancient Greek: , "bearer of light", often translated as "Lucifer" in Latin), since they are all personifications of the same planet Venus. "Heosphoros" in the Greek Septuagint and "Lucifer"  in  Jerome's Latin Vulgate were used to translate the Hebrew "Helel" (Venus as the brilliant, bright or shining one), "son of Shahar (Dawn)" in the Hebrew version of Isaiah 14:12.

Eosphorus/Hesperus was said to be the father of Ceyx and Daedalion. In some sources, he is also said to be the father of the Hesperides.

Maurus Servius Honoratus, in his commentaries on Virgil's Eclogues, mentions that Hesperus inhabited Mount Oeta in Thessaly and that there he had loved the young Hymenaeus, son of Dionysus and Ariadne. Servius makes no distinction between the Evening Star and the Morning Star, calling them both Hesperus and the lucifer of Ida.

"Hesperus is Phosphorus" 

In the philosophy of language, "Hesperus is Phosphorus" is a famous sentence in relation to the semantics of proper names. Gottlob Frege used the terms "the evening star" (der Abendstern) and "the morning star" (der Morgenstern) to illustrate his distinction between sense and reference, and subsequent philosophers changed the example to "Hesperus is Phosphorus" so that it utilized proper names. Saul Kripke used the sentence to posit that the knowledge of something necessary (in this case the identity of Hesperus and Phosphorus) could be empirical rather than knowable a priori.

See also
 Aurvandill, a figure in German mythology also known as Earendel
 Hesperides
 Lucifer, the Latin name for the Morning Star
 "The Wreck of the Hesperus", a poem by Henry Wadsworth Longfellow
 Aspect of Venus

Notes

References 

 Diodorus Siculus, The Library of History translated by Charles Henry Oldfather. Twelve volumes. Loeb Classical Library. Cambridge, Massachusetts: Harvard University Press; London: William Heinemann, Ltd. 1989. Vol. 3. Books 4.59–8. Online version at Bill Thayer's Web Site
 Diodorus Siculus, Bibliotheca Historica. Vol 1-2. Immanel Bekker. Ludwig Dindorf. Friedrich Vogel. in aedibus B. G. Teubneri. Leipzig. 1888-1890. Greek text available at the Perseus Digital Library.
 Hyginus, Fabulae from The Myths of Hyginus translated and edited by Mary Grant. University of Kansas Publications in Humanistic Studies. Online version at the Topos Text Project.
 Maurus Servius Honoratus, In Vergilii carmina comentarii. Servii Grammatici qui feruntur in Vergilii carmina commentarii; recensuerunt Georgius Thilo et Hermannus Hagen. Georgius Thilo. Leipzig. B. G. Teubner. 1881. Online version at the Perseus Digital Library.
 Publius Ovidius Naso, Metamorphoses translated by Brookes More (1859-1942). Boston, Cornhill Publishing Co. 1922. Online version at the Perseus Digital Library.
 Publius Ovidius Naso, Metamorphoses. Hugo Magnus. Gotha (Germany). Friedr. Andr. Perthes. 1892. Latin text available at the Perseus Digital Library.

External links 

Children of Eos
Demigods in classical mythology
Greek gods
LGBT themes in Greek mythology
Philosophy of language
Stellar gods
Venusian deities